My Negro Problem—And Ours is a controversial essay by Norman Podhoretz, published in Commentary magazine in 1963.

About
The essay addresses Podhoretz's racism, which he calls "the hatred I still feel for Negroes", based on his interactions with African-Americans while growing up as a white working-class Jewish boy in Brownsville, Brooklyn. In his integrated neighborhood, most people were either African-American or white. The white people were mostly Italians who spoke Italian and whose grandparents had immigrated from Sicily, or Yiddish-speaking Ashkenazi Jews from Eastern European immigrant backgrounds. In the essay, Podhoretz related incidents of bullying from African-American children in the neighborhood. He expresses that as a child he felt "puzzled" by the idea that "all Jews were rich" and that "all Negroes were persecuted", because his observation was that "the only Jews I knew were poor" and that Black people "were doing the only persecuting I knew about - and doing it, morever, to me." Podhoretz relates an incident where a non-Jewish Black friend hit him and refused to play with him because "I had killed Jesus"; after asking his mother for an explanation, she "cursed the goyim and the Schwartzes, the Schwartzes and the goyim" in Yiddish and told him to ignore "such foolishness". Despite expressing disgust for interracial marriage, Podhoretz writes that widespread interrmariage and the subsequent erasing of racial differences could be a solution to racism: "I believe that the wholesale merging of the two races is the most desirable alternative for everyone concerned."

Reception
Receiving both praise for honesty and condemnation for racism, the essay has been called both notorious and brave.

In We Real Cool: Black Men and Masculinity, bell hooks writes that the essay shows a "fascination with black masculinity", noting that Podhoretz wrote that he "envied Negroes for what seemed to me their superior masculinity" and "what seems to be their superior physical grace and beauty."

The Black writer Nylah Burton wrote in The Forward that the essay is "drivel" that "traffic[s] in hateful stereotypes" and refers to Podhoretz's views on Black masculinity as "creepy" and "fetishizing". Burton condemns Commentary for boasting about having published the essay: "How in 2018 can you brag about having published an article called 'My Negro Problem'? How can you call it the most powerful essay ever published? This fact alone should show us what this publication stands for: rampant anti-blackness, hidden under the thin veneer of 'intellectual rigor' ...Commentary in other words, still has a 'Negro Problem.'"

See also
African American–Jewish relations
Racism in Jewish communities

References

External links
My Negro Problem—And Ours

1963 essays
African-American history in New York City
African American–Jewish relations
American essays
Antisemitism in New York (state)
Ashkenazi Jewish culture in New York City
Brownsville, Brooklyn
Essays about culture
Essays about politics
History of racism in New York (state)
Masculinity
Jews and Judaism in Brooklyn
White American culture in New York (state)
Works about antisemitism
Works about racism
Works about Jews and Judaism
Works about White Americans